Richard Holcomb (born September 21, 1976) is a human rights advocate, street outreach worker and HIV prevention counselor in Providence, Rhode Island. He is best known for his groundbreaking work in HIV prevention and as the founder of Project Weber, a program for male sex-workers in Rhode Island. The program is named after Roy Weber, a 22-year-old male sex worker who was murdered on Christmas Day, 2003. Holcomb has done extensive research on male prostitution in the United States, Canada and Europe, and has been featured in several films on this subject.


Project Weber 
Holcomb is a recovering addict who began his career in HIV prevention in November 2007. The Project Weber outreach team he leads provides condom distribution, needle exchange, substance abuse referrals and HIV testing. Holcomb cited the lack of data available on male commercial sex workers in the region as his reason for helping develop a 2010 survey to assess the needs of this population. Project Weber recruited and surveyed 50 male sex workers living on the streets of Providence. Holcomb also cited that the fact that he and members of his team are former sex workers themselves as one of the primary reasons they were able to gain access to the men in order to conduct this survey.

The project has gleaned valuable data on male sex workers who work and live on the streets of Providence. Holcomb and his team were the first in Rhode Island history to gather data on this population. Prostitution in Rhode Island was legal until 2009.  His work has generated interest from the Centers for Disease Control and Prevention and has received national attention.

On October 1, 2013, Holcomb became Project Director of the first peer support drop-in center for male sex workers in the United States. The center's staff meet their clients in a safe and non-judgmental environment, using a harm reduction approach.

Holcomb has since resigned as director, but continues to be involved in the organization.

In 2016, Project Weber changed its name to Project Weber/RENEW, after deciding to expand its services to male, female and transgender sex workers.

Awards and honors 
Holcomb unveiled Project Weber's long-term plan for the first time at the 2010 HIV Prevention Leadership Summit in Washington, D.C..

He received a "hero's recognition" in the September 2012 issue of POZ magazine and is featured in the documentary films Invisible: The Unseen World of Male Prostitution and Hustler of Providence.

References

External links

Living people
1976 births
HIV/AIDS activists
American male prostitutes
Prostitution in Rhode Island